Johannes Schilling (23 June 1828 in Mittweida – 21 March 1910 in Klotzsche near Dresden) was a German sculptor.

Life and work
Johannes Schilling was the youngest of five children. A year after his birth, his family moved to Dresden, where he grew up. At the age of six, he was sent to a private school and, at fourteen, attended the Dresden Academy of Fine Arts where he was taught drawing by Karl Gottlieb Peschel. After graduating in 1845, he became one of the master pupils in the studio of sculptor Ernst Rietschel. In 1851 and 1852, he went to Berlin to continue his studies with Christian Daniel Rauch and Friedrich Drake.

In 1852, he returned to Dresden, where he worked in the studios of Ernst Julius Hähnel. From 1854 to 1856, he took a study trip to Rome. Finally, in 1857, he established his own studio. That same year, he married Louise Arnold, daughter of the late publisher Ernst Sigismund Arnold (1792-1840). Among their children were Rudolf Schilling, an architect and co-owner of the construction firm Schilling & Graebner, and Katharina Susanna Schilling, who became the wife of chemist Arthur Hantzsch. The writer and historian Heinar Schilling was a child of his second marriage to Minna Neubert.

In 1868, he became a Professor at the Academy, a position he held until his death. By 1888, he was sufficiently famous to establish a museum (designed by his son, Rudolf) to display his models and designs. It was destroyed in 1945, as was most of Dresden by the  fire bombing of Dresden by the  British/Americans. After his death, as a part of his legacy, the city of Mittweida was directed to build a private museum, but these plans had not been realized by 1914 and were put on hold at the outbreak of World War I. His legacy was not fulfilled until 2005, when the Schilling House was established.

Among Schilling's sculptures there are Emperor William's monument in Hamburg, the sculpture series , and the Maximilian monument in Piazza Venezia, Trieste. He also contributed to the Luther Monument of Worms.

References

Further reading
 Gedenkschrift zum 100. Geburtstag von Johannes Schilling. Monse & Rasch, Bautzen 1928.
 Bärbel Stephan: Der sächsische Bildhauer Johannes Schilling (1828–1910). Ein Beitrag zur Geschichte der deutschen Bildhauerkunst des 19. Jahrhunderts. Univ. Diss., Halle-Wittenberg 1988.
 Bärbel Stephan: Sächsische Bildhauerkunst, Johannes Schilling: 1828–1910. Verlag für Bauwesen, Berlin 1996, .
 Stadtverwaltung Mittweida: Johannes Schilling (1828–1910): Bestandskatalog der Schilling-Sammlung Mittweida, insbesondere der Plastik-Sammlung. Stadtarchiv/Stadtmuseum Mittweida, Mittweida 2003.
 Eric Bawor: Johannes Schilling. Künstlerische Sehstudien – Werke. Verlag Schilling & Kappelar, Bautzen 2010, .

External links

 
 Lageplan des Denkmals auf einer Handzeichnung von Schilling im Architekturmuseum der TU Berlin
 Website of the Schilling House Association
 Article in Stadtwiki Dresden

1828 births
1910 deaths
People from Mittweida
People from the Kingdom of Saxony
German sculptors
German male sculptors
20th-century sculptors
19th-century sculptors
Recipients of the Pour le Mérite (civil class)